Molla Amirkhan (also Romanized as Molla Amīrkhān) is a village in Howmeh-ye Shomali Rural District, in the Central District of Eslamabad-e Gharb County, Kermanshah Province, Iran. At the 2006 census, its population was 49, in 15 families.

References 

Populated places in Eslamabad-e Gharb County